The AMD Phenom family is a 64-bit microprocessor family from Advanced Micro Devices (AMD), based on the K10 microarchitecture. It includes the AMD Phenom II X6 hex-core series, Phenom X4 and Phenom II X4 quad-core series, Phenom X3 and Phenom II X3 tri-core series, and Phenom II X2 dual-core series. Other related processors based on the K10 microarchitecture include the Athlon X2 Kuma processors, Athlon II processors, and various Opteron, Sempron, and Turion series. The first Phenoms were released in November 2007. An improved second generation was released in December 2008, named Phenom II. Processors with an e following the model number (e.g., 910e) are low-power models, usually 45 W for Athlons, 65 W for Phenoms. Processors with a "u" following the model number (e.g., 270u) are ultra-low-power models, usually 20 W for single core chips or 25 W for dual core chips.

Features overview

Desktop processors

Phenom series

"Agena" (B2/B3, 65 nm, Quad-core)
 All models support: MMX, SSE, SSE2, SSE3, SSE4a, ABM, Enhanced 3DNow!, NX bit, AMD64, Cool'n'Quiet, AMD-V
 Memory support: DDR2 SDRAM up to PC2-8500

"Toliman" (B2/B3, 65 nm, Tri-core)
 Chip harvests from Agena with one core disabled
 All models support: MMX, SSE, SSE2, SSE3, SSE4a, ABM, Enhanced 3DNow!, NX bit, AMD64, Cool'n'Quiet, AMD-V
 Memory support: DDR2 SDRAM up to PC2-8500

Phenom II series

"Thuban" (E0, 45 nm, Hexa-core)
 All models support: MMX, SSE, SSE2, SSE3, SSE4a, ABM, Enhanced 3DNow!, NX bit, AMD64, Cool'n'Quiet, AMD-V, Turbo Core (AMD equivalent of Intel Turbo Boost)
 Memory support: DDR2 SDRAM up to PC2-8500, DDR3 SDRAM up to PC3-10600 (Socket AM3 only)

"Zosma" (E0, 45 nm, Quad-core)
 Chip harvests from Thuban with two cores disabled
 All models support: MMX, SSE, SSE2, SSE3, SSE4a, ABM, Enhanced 3DNow!, NX bit, AMD64, Cool'n'Quiet, AMD-V, Turbo Core (AMD equivalent of Intel Turbo Boost)
 Memory support: DDR2 SDRAM up to PC2-8500, DDR3 SDRAM up to PC3-10600 (Socket AM3 only)

"Deneb" (C2/C3, 45 nm, Quad-core)
 All models support: MMX, SSE, SSE2, SSE3, SSE4a, ABM, Enhanced 3DNow!, NX bit, AMD64, Cool'n'Quiet, AMD-V
 Memory support: DDR2 SDRAM up to PC2-8500, DDR3 SDRAM up to PC3-10600 (Socket AM3 only)

"Propus" (C3, 45 nm, Quad-core)
 Chip harvests from Deneb with L3 cache disabled
 All models support: MMX, SSE, SSE2, SSE3, SSE4a, ABM, Enhanced 3DNow!, NX bit, AMD64, Cool'n'Quiet, AMD-V
 Memory support: DDR2 SDRAM up to PC2-8500 (DDR2-1066 MHz), DDR3 SDRAM up to PC3-10600 (DDR3-1333 MHz) (Socket AM3 only)

"Heka" (C2/C3, 45 nm, Tri-core)
 Chip harvests from Deneb with one core disabled
 All models support: MMX, SSE, SSE2, SSE3, SSE4a, ABM, Enhanced 3DNow!, NX bit, AMD64, Cool'n'Quiet, AMD-V
 Memory support: DDR2 SDRAM up to PC2-8500, DDR3 SDRAM up to PC3-10600 (Socket AM3 only)
 On some Heka triple core processors e.g. 720 BE, the fourth disabled core can be enabled, effectively providing a quad core processor for the price of a triple core. This however does not work on all the processors with one core disabled.

"Callisto" (C2/C3, 45 nm, Dual-core)
 Chip harvests from Deneb with two cores disabled
 All models support: MMX, SSE, SSE2, SSE3, SSE4a, ABM, Enhanced 3DNow!, NX bit, AMD64, Cool'n'Quiet, AMD-V
 Memory support: DDR2 SDRAM up to PC2-8500, DDR3 SDRAM up to PC3-10600 (Socket AM3 only)
 On some Callisto dual core processors e.g. 555 BE, the two disabled cores can be enabled, effectively providing a quad core processor for the price of a dual core. This however does not work on all the processors with two cores disabled.

"Regor" (C3, 45 nm, Dual-core)
 Most Regor-based processors feature double the L2 cache per core (1 MB) as other Athlon II and Phenom II processors.
 All models support: MMX, SSE, SSE2, SSE3, SSE4a, ABM, Enhanced 3DNow!, NX bit, AMD64, Cool'n'Quiet, AMD-V
 Memory support: DDR2 SDRAM up to PC2-8500, DDR3 SDRAM up to PC3-10600 (DDR3-1333 MHz) (Socket AM3 only)

Phenom II 42 TWKR (C2, 45 nm, Quad-core, Limited Edition)
AMD released a limited edition Deneb-based processor to extreme overclockers and partners. Fewer than 100 were made.

The "42" officially represents four cores running at 2 GHz, but is also a reference to the answer to life, the universe, and everything from The Hitchhiker's Guide to the Galaxy.

Mobile processors

Turion II Ultra mobile processors (Phenom-based)

"Caspian" (45 nm, Dual-core)
 Based on the AMD K10 microarchitecture
 All models support: MMX, SSE, SSE2, SSE3, SSE4a, ABM, Enhanced 3DNow!, NX bit, AMD64, PowerNow!, AMD-V

Turion II mobile processors (Phenom-based)

"Caspian" (45 nm, Dual-core)
 Based on the AMD K10 microarchitecture
 All models support: MMX, SSE, SSE2, SSE3, SSE4a, ABM, Enhanced 3DNow!, NX bit, AMD64, PowerNow!, AMD-V

Phenom II mobile processors
 Based on the AMD K10 microarchitecture
 All models support: MMX, SSE, SSE2, SSE3, SSE4a, ABM, Enhanced 3DNow!, NX bit, AMD64, Cool'n'Quiet, AMD-V
 Memory support: DDR3 SDRAM, DDR3L SDRAM
 Unlike Phenom II desktop processors, Phenom II mobile processors lack L3 cache.

"Champlain" (45 nm, Quad-core)

"Champlain" (45 nm, Triple-core)

"Champlain" (45 nm, Dual-core)

Turion II (Phenom II-based)
 Based on the AMD K10 microarchitecture
 All models support: MMX, SSE, SSE2, SSE3, SSE4a, ABM, Enhanced 3DNow!, NX bit, AMD64, Cool'n'Quiet, AMD-V
 Memory support: DDR3 SDRAM, DDR3L SDRAM

"Champlain" (45 nm, Dual-core)

Turion II Neo (Phenom II-based)
 Based on the AMD K10 microarchitecture
 All models support: MMX, SSE, SSE2, SSE3, SSE4a, ABM, Enhanced 3DNow!, NX bit, AMD64, Cool'n'Quiet, AMD-V
 Memory support: DDR3 SDRAM, DDR3L SDRAM

"Geneva" (45 nm, Dual-core)

Embedded processors

V-series (Phenom II-based)
 Based on the AMD K10 microarchitecture
 Only 64 bit FPU
 All models support: MMX, SSE, SSE2, SSE3, SSE4a, ABM, Enhanced 3DNow!, NX bit, AMD64, Cool'n'Quiet, AMD-V
 Memory support: DDR3 SDRAM, DDR3L SDRAM

"Champlain" (45 nm, Single-core)

"Geneva" (45 nm, Single-core)

Notes

See also
 List of AMD Athlon II microprocessors
 AMD Phenom
 AMD K10
 List of AMD microprocessors
 Table of AMD processors

References

External links
 Model Number and Feature Comparisons - AMD Phenom II X4 Processors
 Official AMD processors for desktop comparison website
 Legit Reviews:AMD 42 TWKR BE

Phenom
AMD Phenom

ja:AMD Phenom
ja:AMD Phenom II